Spiritual marriage may refer to:
Bahá'í marriage
Celestial marriage, a doctrine of Mormonism and Swedenborgianism
Josephite marriage, a Christian form of marriage without sexual activity
Mystical marriage, union with God portrayed as a spousal relationship
 A marriage between soulmates
Spiritual wifery, a form of free love associated with polygamy
Syneisaktism, cohabitation of a couple who have previously taken vows of chastity